The 2000 Critérium du Dauphiné Libéré was the 52nd edition of the cycle race and was held from 4 June to 11 June 2000. The race started in Grenoble and finished in Sallanches. The race was won by Tyler Hamilton of the U.S. Postal Service team.

Teams
Fourteen teams, containing a total of 112 riders, participated in the race:

Route

General classification

Notes

References

Further reading

2000
2000 in French sport
June 2000 sports events in France